Elisabeth Sophie of Saxe-Altenburg (10 October 1619 – 20 December 1680), was a princess of Saxe-Altenburg and, by marriage, duchess of Saxe-Gotha.

She was born in Halle, the only daughter of Johann Philipp, Duke of Saxe-Altenburg, and his wife, Elisabeth of Brunswick-Wolfenbüttel.

Life
In Altenburg on 24 October 1636, Elisabeth Sophie married her kinsman Ernst I, Duke of Saxe-Gotha. As a dowry, she received 20,000 guilders, who were pledged by the town of Roßla. As Widow's seat, the bride obtained the towns of Kapellendorf and Berka, with the called Gartenhaus in Weimar. 

Because according to the succession laws of the House of Saxe-Altenburg (which excluded the women from inheritance), after her father died two years later (1 April 1639), he was succeeded by his brother, Frederick Wilhelm II.

When her cousin, the duke Frederick Wilhelm III died childless in 1672, Elisabeth Sophie became in the general heiress of all the branch of Saxe-Altenburg on the basis of her father's testament (as it was ultimately recognized in law that the Salic Law does not prevent an agnate from willing all his possessions to those other agnates of the house he desires to make his heirs, leaving other agnates without; and if those favored agnates also happened to be the testator's son-in-law and maternal grandsons, that's in no way prohibited). 

Ernest I of Saxe-Gotha claimed the whole succession of Saxe-Altenburg, claimed both being the closest male relative and his wife's rights. However, the other branch of the family, the Dukes of Saxe-Weimar didn't accept that will, opening a succession dispute.

Finally, Elisabeth Sophie and Ernst's sons received most of Saxe-Altenburg inheritance, but a portion (a quarter of the original duchy of Saxe-Altenburg) passed to the Saxe-Weimar branch. Hence, the Ernestine line of Saxe-Gotha-Altenburg was founded, which would exist until 1825.

When Duke Ernst I died in 1675, his numerous sons divided the inheritance (five eighths of all Ernestine lands) into seven parts: Gotha-Altenburg, Coburg, Meiningen, Römhild, Eisenberg, Hildburghausen and Saalfeld. Of them, Coburg, Römhild and Eisenberg did not survive over that one generation and were divided between the four remaining lines.

Of the four remaining duchies, only two branches survive until today: Meiningen and Saalfeld (which eventually became the house of Saxe-Coburg-Gotha). Through the Saalfeld branch, Elisabeth Sophie is a direct ancestress of the British Royal Family.

After her husband's death, Elisabeth Sophie changed the towns originally given to her as Widow's seat in her marriage for the towns of Reinhardsbrunn and Tenneberg. Under the name "the Chaste", she was a member of the Virtuous Society. She died in Gotha, aged 61.

Issue
Ernst and Elisabeth Sophie had eighteen children:
 Johann Ernest (b. Weimar, 18 September 1638 – d. Weimar, 27 November 1638).
 Elisabeth Dorothea  (b. Coburg, 8 January 1640 – d. Butzbach, 24 August 1709), married on 5 December 1666 to Louis VI, Landgrave of Hesse-Darmstadt.
 Johann Ernest (b. Gotha, 16 May 1641 – d. of smallpox, Gotha, 31 December 1657).
 Christian (b. and d. Gotha, 23 February 1642).
 Sophie (b. Gotha, 21 February 1643 – d. of smallpox, Gotha, 14 December 1657).
 Johanna (b. Gotha, 14 February 1645 – d. [of smallpox?] Gotha, 7 December 1657).
 Frederick I, Duke of Saxe-Gotha-Altenburg (b. Gotha, 15 July 1646 – d. Friedrichswerth, 2 August 1691).
 Albert, Duke of Saxe-Coburg (b. Gotha, 24 May 1648 – d. Coburg, 6 August 1699).
 Bernhard I, Duke of Saxe-Meiningen (b. Gotha, 10 September 1649 – d. Meiningen, 27 April 1706).
 Henry, Duke of Saxe-Römhild (b. Gotha, 19 November 1650 – d. Römhild, 13 May 1710).
 Christian, Duke of Saxe-Eisenberg (b. Gotha, 6 January 1653 – d. Eisenberg, 28 April 1707).
 Dorothea Maria (b. Gotha, 12 February 1654 – d. Gotha, 17 June 1682).
 Ernest, Duke of Saxe-Hildburghausen (b. Gotha, 12 June 1655 – d. Hildburghausen, 17 October 1715).
 Johann Philip (b. Gotha, 1 March 1657 – d. Gotha, 19 May 1657).
 Johann Ernest, Duke of Saxe-Coburg-Saalfeld (b. Gotha, 22 August 1658 – d. Saalfeld, 17 February 1729).
 Johanna Elisabeth (b. Gotha, 2 September 1660 – d. Gotha, 18 December 1660).
 Johann Philip (b. Gotha, 16 November 1661 – d. Gotha, 13 March 1662).
 Sophie Elisabeth (b. Gotha, 19 May 1663 – d. Gotha, 23 May 1663).
Their eldest son Frederick was the first to inherit this title. His granddaughter from this son, Anna Sophie of Saxe-Gotha-Altenburg, was a direct matrilineal ancestor of George V of the United Kingdom and Nicholas II of Russia. His younger son John was father to Franz Josias, Duke of Saxe-Coburg-Saalfeld.

References
 August Beck: Ernst der Fromme, Herzog zu Sachsen-Gotha und Altenburg, H. Böhlau, 1865, p. 754. (Digitalisat)
 Ludwig Storch: Das Fürstenhaus von Gotha, Erfurt 1826, p. 155.

Notes

|-

|-

1619 births
1680 deaths
People from Halle (Saale)
Duchesses of Saxe-Gotha
Duchesses of Saxe-Altenburg
Daughters of monarchs